The Itsy Pocket Computer is a small, low-power, handheld device with a highly flexible interface. It was designed at Digital Equipment Corporation's Western Research Laboratory to encourage novel user interface development—for example, it had accelerometers to detect movement and orientation as early as 1999.

Hardware 
 CPU: DEC StrongARM SA-1100 processor
 Memory: 16 MB of DRAM, 4 MB of flash memory
 Interfaces: I/O interfaces for audio input/output, IrDA, and an RS232 serial port
 Small 320 x 200 pixel LCD touchscreen for display and user input
 10 general purpose push-buttons for additional user input purposes
 Power supply: Pair of standard AAA alkaline batteries

References

Related WRL Technical Notes 
 The Itsy Pocket Computer Version 1.5: User's Manual (DEC WRL Technical Note WRL-TN-54)
 The Memory Daughter-Card Version 1.5: User's Manual (DEC WRL Technical Note WRL-TN-55)
 Power and Energy Characterization of the Itsy Pocket Computer (Version 1.5) (DEC WRL Technical Note WRL-TN-56)
 A Simple CMOS Camera for Itsy (DEC WRL Technical Note WRL-TN-58)
 Power Evaluation of Itsy Version 2.4 (DEC WRL Technical Note WRL-TN-59) 
 Interpreting the Battery Lifetime of the Itsy Version 2.4 (DEC WRL Technical Note WRL-TN-59)
 The Itsy Pocket Computer, Joel F. Bartlett, Lawrence S. Brakmo, Keith I. Farkas, William R. Hamburgen, Timothy Mann, Marc A. Viredaz, Carl A. Waldspurger, Deborah A. Wallach, WRL Research Report 2000/6, Compaq Western Research Laboratory, 250 University Ave, Palo Alto, CA 94301.

External links 
 Itsy downloads at HP Labs

DEC computers
Personal digital assistants